Laura Imbruglia (born 15 June 1983) is an Australian indie rock singer-songwriter.

Early life and family 
Imbruglia's father is an Italian of Sicilian heritage and her mother Anglo-Australian. She grew up on the Central Coast. Among four daughters, Imbruglia is the youngest in her family; one of her elder sisters is pop-alternative singer and actress Natalie Imbruglia. Imbruglia has insisted on maintaining her musical career independent of her famous sibling.

Career 
Imbruglia has released a single, EP and four albums. Her debut album was released through Chatterbox Records/MGM, Silversonic Records (DE) and Strange Ears (DK), and the others were released independently through her own label Ready Freddie Records. She was featured on jtv, where "Looking for a Rabbit" was voted No. 2 music video of the year in 2007, and MTV Australia and performed at the 2002 Homebake festival. She has appeared on the television drama series Crash Palace.

Imbruglia toured Europe in late 2007 and March 2008 to promote her self-titled album, including dates in Germany, Switzerland, Austria, Denmark and the UK. She released her second album "The Lighter Side Of..." in 2010, prior to relocating from Sydney NSW to Melbourne VIC. Imbruglia chose "depressing, countrified, stark, humorous and bent," as five words to sum up the record.

In 2013, Laura released country album "What A Treat" with a new band composed of Melbourne musicians.

From 2015 to 2017, she embarked on a new career – producing, writing and hosting web series "Amateur Hour" – an episodic arts and culture show based in Melbourne which featured the popular skit "Gender Reversed Guitar Shopping" along with performances from emerging and established Australian musicians and interviews with creatives.

In 2019, she returned to music, releasing her fourth album "Scared Of You".

Personal life 
Imbruglia is currently based in Melbourne. Karaoke is something of an obsession for Imbruglia.

Imbruglia grew up listening to Bob Dylan, The Carpenters and Queen, the latter being the largest influence on Imbruglia, who proudly wears a tattoo of Freddie Mercury on her right arm. She used to work in a record store.

Discography 
 It Makes a Crunchy Noise (2003) – EP
 "My Dream of a Magical Washing Machine" (2005) – single
 Laura Imbruglia (2006) – album
 The Lighter Side of... (2010) – album
 What A Treat (2013) – album
Scared Of You (2019) – album

References

External links 

1983 births
Australian rock singers
Australian singer-songwriters
People from the Central Coast (New South Wales)
Singers from Melbourne
Singers from Sydney
Australian people of English descent
Australian people of Italian descent
Australian people of Sicilian descent
Living people
21st-century Australian singers
21st-century Australian women singers
Australian women singer-songwriters